Deyan Kirilov (born June 20, 1964 in Sofia) is a retired boxer from Bulgaria, who competed for his native country at the 1988 Summer Olympics in Seoul, South Korea. There he was defeated in the first round of the Men's Light Heavyweight Division (– 81 kg) by Yugoslavia's eventual bronze medalist Damir Škaro.

References

External links
 
 

1964 births
Living people
Light-heavyweight boxers
Olympic boxers of Bulgaria
Boxers at the 1988 Summer Olympics
Sportspeople from Sofia
Bulgarian male boxers
AIBA World Boxing Championships medalists